Lupul may refer to:

Lupul (surname)

Lupul may also refer to the following rivers in Romania:
 Lupul, a tributary of the Râul Mic in Alba County
 Lupul, another name for the upper course of the Dămuc in Harghita County
 Lupul, a tributary of the Călinești in Vâlcea County
 Lupul, a tributary of the Lotru in Vâlcea County
 Lupul (Tazlău), a tributary of the Tazlău in Bacău County
 Lupul, another name for the upper course of the Uria in Vâlcea County

See also 
 Lupulești